Electric Loco Shed, Erode is one of the premiere engine sheds located in Erode in the Indian state of Tamil Nadu.

Locomotives

See also 
Electric Loco Shed, Arakkonam
Electric Loco Shed, Royapuram
Diesel Loco Shed, Ernakulam
Diesel Loco Shed, Erode
Diesel Loco Shed, Golden Rock
Diesel Loco Shed, Tondiarpet

References

External links 

 Website

Erode
Salem railway division
Transport in Erode
1998 establishments in Tamil Nadu
Rail transport in Tamil Nadu